2022 Lyon Open may refer to:

2022 ATP Lyon Open
2022 WTA Lyon Open